Dumbbells in Ermine is a 1930 American early talkie pre-Code comedy film based on the 1925 play Weak Sisters by Lynn Starling. The film stars Robert Armstrong and Barbara Kent, and features Beryl Mercer, James Gleason, and Claude Gillingwater.

Cast
Robert Armstrong as Jerry Malone 
Barbara Kent as Faith Corey 
Beryl Mercer as Grandma Corey
James Gleason as Mike 
Claude Gillingwater as Uncle Roger
Julia Swayne Gordon as Mrs. Corey  
Arthur Hoyt as Siegfried Strong 
Mary Foy as Mrs. Strong  
Charlotte Merriam as Camilla

Plot
In a small town in Virginia, Barbara Kent, is being forced into a marriage with a missionary reformer by her socially prominent parents. Kent meets Robert Armstrong, a prizefighter, and falls in love with him. Armstrong's manager, played by James Gleason, tries to dissuade Armstrong from the relationship.

Nevertheless, Kent's grandmother, played by Beryl Mercer, and her uncle, played by Claude Gillingwater, do their best to help the romance between Kent and Armstrong. Eventually Kent and Armstrong quarrel, and this leads Kent to agree to her mother's request that she marry the missionary (Arthur Hoyt). When the missionary invites some weak sisters to a revival meeting one of them, a showgirl, accuses him of being responsible for her downfall.

Because of this, the missionary is publicly disgraced and the marriage cancelled. Gleason helps Armstrong become reconciled with Kent and they marry with the blessings of the family.

Preservation status
The film is believed to be lost.

See also
List of lost films

References
Notes

External links 
 
 

1930 films
Warner Bros. films
Lost American films
American black-and-white films
Films directed by John G. Adolfi
1930s romantic comedy-drama films
American romantic comedy-drama films
1930 comedy films
1930 drama films
1930s English-language films
1930s American films